The year 580 BC was a year of the pre-Julian Roman calendar. In the Roman Empire, it was known as year 174 Ab urbe condita . The denomination 580 BC for this year has been used since the early medieval period, when the Anno Domini calendar era became the prevalent method in Europe for naming years.

Events
 Gorgon Medusa, detail of sculpture from the west pediment of the Temple of Artemis, Korkyra, is made (approximate date). It is now at the Archaeological Museum of Corfu.
 Standing Youth (Kouros) is made (approximate date). It is now at the Metropolitan Museum of Art in New York.
 Cambyses I succeeds his father Cyrus I as king of Anshan and head of the Achaemenid Dynasty.

Births

Deaths
 Cyrus I, king of Anshan

References